V. Harikrishna (born 5 November 1974) is an Indian film score and soundtrack composer, playback singer and film producer. He has mainly scored music for Kannada films. After his stint as a programmer and assistant musician, Harikrishna made his debut as an independent composer in actor Darshan's first production venture Jothe Jotheyali in 2006. Since then, he has been scoring for majority of Darshan's films besides working for many other leading production houses. He owns an audio company called "D-Beats" established in 2013 and produces music under his own company starting from the film Bulbul (2013). He has turned into a director with the 2019 Kannada film 'Yajamana'.

Harikrishna has won three consecutive Filmfare Award for Best Music for Gaalipata in 2008, Raaj The Showman in 2009 and Jackie in 2010.

Early life
Harikrishna was born in 1974 in Bangalore, in the Karnataka state of India. At the age of eight, he began playing keyboard in an orchestra that his father bought and named after him. He took to playing the keyboard professionally in 1987 and discontinued his studies after matriculation. In his first professional assignment, he worked with composer, Manoranjan Prabhakar. Following his father's death in 1990, Harikrishna took over his mechanic shop, where he worked as a mechanic. In 1994, following composer Sadhu Kokila's insistence, Harikrishna took to music again.

Career

Music programming and arranging
Harikrishna started out working as an assistant to many leading music directors in 1990's including Hamsalekha, V. Ravichandran, Sadhu Kokila, Gurukiran among others. He has worked as a programmer, an arranger and as a keyboard player for many music directors. He has worked for feature films, short films, daily soaps, ad jingles and private musical albums.

Music direction
In 2006, Harikrishna was first signed up to compose music for actor Darshan's first home production Jothe Jotheyali. Until this time, Harikrishna was a struggling musician under the protege of actor - director V. Ravichandran. Despite the industry's negative feedback for his move, Darshan went on to sign him as the music director. The film, starring Prem and Ramya in the lead and Darshan in a guest role, was directed by Dinakar Thoogudeepa and had a successful run for about 25 weeks. The film's soundtrack was hugely popular upon release and this immediately silenced the critics.  This was immediately followed by the actor's second home production Navagraha. Since then, Harikrishna has been the official composer for most of the Darshan starrer films and productions. Some of the successful collaborations with Darshan include Bhoopathi (2007), Gaja (2008), Porki (2010), Prince (2011), Saarathi (2011) and Chingari (2012) to name a few.

His first collaboration with director - lyricist Yogaraj Bhat for the film Gaalipata (2008) starring Ganesh fetched him his maiden Filmfare award for his successful soundtrack. Another film Payana in the same year saw him belting out soft romantic melodies which was appreciated. The year 2009 proved to be more successful for him with back to back successful soundtracks for the films such as Ambari, Junglee, Raam, Maleyali Jotheyali and Raj, The Showman. While in the former film, he debuted as a playback singer, the latter film fetched him his second Filmfare award for best music direction.

In 2010, Harikrishna composed for 8 feature films and most of them were received very well upon release. Most noteworthy being Jackie which fetched him his third and hat trick Filmfare award and Super directed and enacted by Upendra. The year 2011 saw him composing for over 14 films with many of them turning to be blockbusters and musically well appreciated. Prince, Hudugaru, Vishnuvardhana, Saarathi, Paramathma and Jogayya turned out to be biggest musical blockbusters cementing the top status for him. The success was followed in 2012 with Chingari, Anna Bond, Katariveera Surasundarangi, Addhuri, Jaanu, Drama Yaare Koogadali and Prem Adda receiving enormous positive response both musically and at the box-office. He was also awarded for his singing in Anna Bond by the SIIMA. His fourth Filmfare award was for his second collaboration with Yogaraj Bhat, Drama. Addhuri won him Udaya awards for his music direction.

The successful journey continued further in 2013 with many chartbuster soundtracks for the films such as Topiwala, Bachchan, Bulbul, Kaddipudi, Sakkare and Shravani Subramanya. In 2014, his first musical release Gajakesari evoked mixed response while his scores for films such as Fair & Lovely and Ambareesha was expected to be successful.

Film production
In 2012, Harikrishna announced his intention in producing films and he started it with the film  Jai Bajarangabali starring Ajay Rao and Sindhu Lokanath. He was also reported to be directing the Yogesh starrer Raate. His audio company D-Beats acquired the audio rights of the film Adyaksha in 2014 which had music composed by Arjun Janya.

Personal life
Harikrishna is married to singer and composer Vani Harikrishna, the granddaughter of veteran composer G. K. Venkatesh. They have a son, Aditya, who started as a playback singer with one of Harikrishna's composed films.

Discography

Awards
 Won 3 consecutive Filmfare Award for Best Music (Gaalipata, Raaj The Showman and Jackie)
 RNJ awards in 2009
 Suvarna Film Awards for Best Music Director (Raaj the Showman, Drama)
 2012 – Filmfare Award for Drama
 Karnataka State Award for the film Raaj The Showman
 2012 – Nominated – Best Music Director for Anna Bond
 2018 – Nominated – Filmfare Award for Best Music Director – Kannada for Raajakumara
 2017 - Karnataka State Award for Best Music Director - For Raajakumara
 2021- SIIMA Award for Best Music Director for Yajamana

References

External links
 

Living people
Singers from Bangalore
20th-century classical composers
21st-century classical composers
Kannada film score composers
Kannada playback singers
Indian male playback singers
Filmfare Awards South winners
20th-century Indian composers
1974 births
Film musicians from Karnataka
20th-century Indian singers
21st-century Indian singers
Musicians from Karnataka
21st-century Indian composers
20th-century Indian male singers
21st-century Indian male singers